The lists shown below shows the Egypt national football team all-time record against opposing nations. The statistics are composed of all men's A matches only. Olympic games are not included.

All-time records
The following table shows Egypt's all-time international record, correct as of 18 November 2022.

References

Egypt national football team